The Rural Society of Durazno is a prominent Uruguayan grouping of landowners and economic actors in Durazno Department.

Activities and events
Livestock raising is a major portion of the region's economy, for the interests of which the Society, itself founded in 1911, is a major representative.

In 2008 the Society organized its 95th annual cattle show.

Leadership
Among the more prominent figures in the Society's leadership is Dr. Santiago Bordaberry. A wide range of herds is represented in the Society (Bordaberry's personal cattle specialism is an Australian herd).

See also
 Agriculture in Uruguay
 Durazno Department#Notable people

References

 
 :es:Santiago Bordaberry

Agriculture in Uruguay
Durazno Department